Uplands Cheese Company is a dairy farm and artisan cheesemaker in  Dodgeville, Wisconsin, U.S.  

ABC News called the business a great American creamery. Their Pleasant Ridge Reserve was chosen by the Food Network's Simon Majumdar as one of the 10 best foods in the US, and has won numerous awards.

References

Further reading
The All American Cheese and Wine Book by Laura Werlin (profiles Uplands)

External links

Cheesemakers
Food and drink companies based in Wisconsin
Iowa County, Wisconsin
Dairy products companies of the United States